Arc of the Testimony is the second and final album by the American jazz fusion band Arcana. It was released on bassist Bill Laswell's Axiom label on October 14, 1997. Unlike the trio configuration on the first album, this project features a spacier, slightly less abstract form of fusion music. Bill Laswell and drummer Tony Williams composed and developed the music, and co-produced the album together.

Laswell invited a number of musicians to contribute, including legendary tenor saxophonist Pharoah Sanders. Other contributors included alto saxophonist Byard Lancaster, and electric guitarists Nicky Skopelitis and Buckethead. Tony Williams died suddenly on February 23, 1997, while this album was still in production, and thus it represents his last recorded work.

Reception

In a review for AllMusic, Stephen Thomas Erlewine wrote: "Arc of the Testimony is a freewheeling, unpredictable blend of electronic and acoustic sounds... it finds a common ground between improvisation and post-production studio trickery. All of the musicians... are open-minded and help push the music forward, resulting in a thoroughly involving, challenging listen."

The authors of the Penguin Guide to Jazz Recordings stated: "As a memorial to Williams, this probably isn't as typical as some of the last albums with acoustic groups, but it serves as a forceful reminder of the immense power he was holding in check even when he was playing straight fours and quiet ballad figures."

Track listing

Personnel
Musicians
 Bill Laswell – bass guitar, synthesizer
 Tony Williams – drums
 Pharoah Sanders – tenor saxophone
 Nicky Skopelitis – guitar, oud
 Byard Lancaster – alto saxophone on "Gone Tomorrow", "Into the Circle", "Calling Out the Blue Light"
 Graham Haynes – cornet on "Gone Tomorrow" and "Into the Circle"
 Buckethead – guitar on "Illuminator", "Returning" and "Circles of Hell"

Production
 Bill Laswell – production
 Tony Williams – production
 Robert Musso – engineer
 Michael Fossenkemper – engineer (mastering)
 Oz Fritz – assistant engineer 
 Russell Mills – artwork
 Michael Webster – design

References

Arcana (American band) albums
1997 albums
Albums produced by Bill Laswell
Axiom (record label) albums